Cinere is a district of the city of Depok, West Java, Indonesia. It covers an area of 10.55 km2 and had a population of 107,461 at the 2010 Census; the latest official estimate (for mid 2018) is 144,038. Cinere borders to its east with the Jagakarsa District and to its north with the Cilandak District, both being part of South Jakarta City; to the west it borders with the Ciputat Timur District and the Pamulang District of South Tangerang City within Banten Province; and to the south it borders the Limo District of Depok City. Cinere has a large multi-racial population as a result of long-term transmigration from elsewhere in West Java and from Banten, that began in the late 1960s.

History
In the early colonial period in the Cinere region (Ci Kanyere) there was a stretch of land belonging to Isaac de I 'Ostale de Saint Martin (born in Oleron, Bearn, France in 1629) who worked for the VOC. In the era of independence, the area were inhabited by Betawi people and there were rubber forests, rice fields and swamps.

Cinere was a village of Bogor Regency until 1999. It was included with Depok city in 1999. In 2007, Cinere District was split off from Limo District to form the eleventh district of Depok city.

Facilities
Cinere has many places of worship, hospitals, and malls.  In addition, there are several housing area and golf courses such as Pangkalan Jati and Sawangan. 

This area is growing rapidly because of the construction of Cinere-Serpong Toll Road and Cinere-Jagorawi Toll Road, which are part of the Jakarta Outer Ring Road 2 or JORR 2. Cirene is served by Pondok Cabe Airport, although the airport doesn't handle commercial flights. Pondok Cabe is situated to the west of Cinere, in Pamulang District of the city of South Tangerang in Banten province, approximately 15 kilometers south of Jakarta (South).

References

External links
 http://webarchive.loc.gov/all/20130725193838/http%3A//indra.sg.or.id/cinere/

Depok
Populated places in West Java